The Great Harvest Bread Company is a franchise in the United States that sells fresh-baked bread and other items.

History 
In the late 1970s, Pete and Laura Wakeman, college students and founders of Great Harvest, set up a roadside stand and began baking fresh-ground whole wheat bread in Durham, Connecticut. After graduation, they opened the first Great Harvest Company in Great Falls, Montana in 1976. In 1978, the second bakery opened near Kalispell, Montana, then Jacque Sanchez opened a third in Spokane, Washington, which is still in business. Following this, a franchise office was established in 1983. Great Harvest became the nation's first whole grain bread franchise. Great Harvest is led today by President and CEO Mike Ferretti.

Daily breads
Honey Whole Wheat made with 100% whole grains - Ground wheat flour mixed with water, honey, yeast, and salt
Farmhouse White - Fresh-milled whole wheat and unprocessed white flour with water, yeast, honey, and salt

Specialty breads
Dakota - 100% whole grain bread with pumpkin seeds, sunflower seeds, millet, and sesame seeds
Nine Grain – 100% whole grain bread made with whole wheat flour, barley, hulled buckwheat, corn, flax, millet, oats, red wheat, rye, and white wheat
Cinnamon Raisin Walnut – Made of cinnamon, walnuts, raisins, and molasses
Spelt – This is an Egyptian grain bread made of spelt flour mixed with water, honey, yeast, and salt
Cranberry Orange – Bread with dried cranberries and orange puree rolled into the dough
Spinach Feta- Half wheat, half white bread with spinach and feta cheese

See also
 List of bakeries

References

External links 

The Great Harvest Bread Company

Bakeries of the United States
Companies based in Montana
1976 establishments in Montana